William Orchard may refer to:
W. Arundel Orchard (William Arundel Orchard, 1867–1961), British-born Australian organist, composer and music educator
William E. Orchard (1877–1955), British preacher
Billy Orchard (1888–1965), Australian rules footballer
William Orchard (architect) (died 1504), English gothic architect
William Orchard (water polo) (1929–2014), Australian water polo player